Kochbek or Koch’bek’ may refer to:
 Qoçbəyli, Azerbaijan
 Ughedzor, Armenia